Bicyclus sangmelinae, or Condamin's bush brown, is a butterfly in the family Nymphalidae. It is found in Guinea, Sierra Leone, Liberia, Ivory Coast, Ghana, Nigeria, Cameroon and possibly the Central African Republic and Togo. The habitat consists of forests.

References

Elymniini
Butterflies described in 1963